Hits and Rarities is a second greatest hits album by American singer/songwriter Sheryl Crow, released on November 12, 2007 in Europe. It was released as single disc and a limited edition two-disc version.

Track listing
"All I Wanna Do" (from Tuesday Night Music Club) – 4:34
"My Favorite Mistake" (from The Globe Sessions) – 4:05
"Soak Up the Sun" (from C'mon, C'mon) – 4:51
"Always on Your Side" (featuring Sting) (from Wildflower) – 4:10
"The First Cut Is The Deepest" (from The Very Best of Sheryl Crow) – 3:45
"Everyday Is A Winding Road" (from Sheryl Crow) – 4:17
"Try Not To Remember" (from Home of the Brave Soundtrack) – 4:39
"Leaving Las Vegas" (from Tuesday Night Music Club) – 5:08
"Strong Enough" (from Tuesday Night Music Club) – 3:10
"If It Makes You Happy" (from Sheryl Crow) – 5:21
"Run Baby Run" (from Tuesday Night Music Club) – 4:51
"I Shall Believe" (from Tuesday Night Music Club) – 5:33
"Light In Your Eyes" (from The Very Best of Sheryl Crow) – 4:01
"C'mon, C'mon" (from C'mon, C'mon) – 4:25
"A Change Would Do You Good" (from Sheryl Crow) – 3:50
"Wildflower" (from Wildflower) – 3:57
"Sweet Child o' Mine" (from Big Daddy Soundtrack and later pressings of The Globe Sessions) – 3:51
"Tomorrow Never Dies" (from Tomorrow Never Dies Soundtrack) – 4:50

Hits and Rarities (Limited Edition)
"Run Baby Run" (Live with Eric Clapton) (original version on Tuesday Night Music Club) – 6:07
"Chances Are" (original version on Wildflower) – 5:14
"You're An Original" (Live From Budokan) (original version on C'mon, C'mon) – 5:52
"The Difficult Kind" (Live From Budokan) (original version on The Globe Sessions) – 5:39
"Where Has All The Love Gone" (Acoustic Version) (original version on Wildflower) – 3:40
"Steve McQueen" (Live Radio Portugal) (original version on C'mon, C'mon) – 3:26
"Riverwide" (Live for Wise Buddha) (original version on The Globe Sessions) – 4:14
"Everyday Is A Winding Road" (AOL Live) (original version on Sheryl Crow) – 5:04
"Subway Ride" (hidden track on The Globe Sessions and B-side to My Favorite Mistake single) – 3:57
"Leaving Las Vegas" (Live from Budokan) (original version on Tuesday Night Music Club) – 7:20
"Safe And Sound" (Live From Budokan) (original version on C'mon, C'mon) – 5:36
"Keep On Growing" (from Boys on the Side OST) – 5:27

Sheryl Crow compilation albums
2007 greatest hits albums
Albums produced by Garth Fundis
Albums produced by Bill Bottrell
A&M Records compilation albums